Soma Sengupta, MD, PhD, FRCP (born 1968) is a British-American physician-scientist and holds the Harold C. Schott Endowed Chair of Molecular Therapeutics at the University of Cincinnati College of Medicine. She is a specialty board certified neuro-oncologist board certified Neurologist as well as fellowship-trained in Integrative Medicine. She is a full-time faculty member of the Department of Neurology and Rehabilitation Medicine at the University of Cincinnati and on the Medical Staff at Cincinnati Children's Hospital Medical Center.

Research and career 
She completed a PhD in Biochemistry (1994) and a MBBChir (2002), both at the University of Cambridge, U.K. After her Ph.D. she worked in Professor Carolyn Slayman's laboratory at Yale University on membrane protein biology. She was a Visiting Fellow at various institutions (2000-2007), which included immunology research at the Cambridge Institute of Medical Research with Wellcome Trust Principal Research Fellow Professor Paul Lehner, membrane protein research with Professor Rajini Rao at Johns Hopkins, and pediatric brain tumor research with Professor Scott Pomeroy at Boston Children's Hospital, Boston.

She completed a Neurology Residency at Beth Israel Deaconess Medical Center-Harvard (2011), a Clinical Fellowship in Neuro-Oncology (2013) at Boston Children's Hospital/Dana-Farber Cancer Institute/Mass General, and an Integrative Medicine Fellowship (2023) at the Andrew Weil Center for Integrative Medicine, The University of Arizona.

Her first faculty appointment was as an instructor in the Department of Neurology at Beth Israel Deaconess Medical Center, Boston. She discovered that medulloblastoma tumor cell viability could be impaired by activating the GABA-A receptor with a new class of benzodiazepine analogs. She then took an appointment in the Department of Neurology at Emory University, where in collaboration with biochemist Professor Daniel Pomeranz Krummel (University of Cincinnati) and medicinal chemist Professor James Cook (University of Wisconsin-Milwaukee), reported on the regression of melanoma tumors in mice using benzodiazepine analogs by both a direct mechanism and by enhancing infiltration of immune cells into the tumor microenvironment.

Since 2019 she is the holder of the Harold C. Schott Endowed Chair of Molecular Therapeutics, Associate Director of the University of Cincinnati Gardner Neuroscience Institute Brain Tumor Center and Director of the Division of Neuro-Oncology. She is also a Bye Fellow at Lucy Cavendish College, University of Cambridge, U.K.

In Cincinnati, she leads both a translation laboratory and a clinical research team. A major focus of her lab research is the development of an antineoplastic approach involving use of novel small molecule targeted modulators to perturb ion homeostastis and induce apoptosis in disparate cancer cells, including CNS and systemic cancers that commonly metastasize to the brain. She co-founded a corporation with Daniel Pomeranz Krummel and James Cook to advance this strategy. Her clinical research includes employing novel therapeutic apps, including to remediate neurological deficits in cancer patients caused by treatments. She also is a clinical trialist centered in the neuro-oncology space.

She has authored/co-authored greater than 70 publications. She has also authored a book on brain tumor patients that is aimed for patients and clinical trainees; and featured on several news articles and TV interviews to discuss her research. She is also an author of two volumes of poetry and a children's book.

Awards and honors
In 2021 Sengupta became a Fellow of the Royal College of Physicians. She has received many NIH training grants including the R25, K12 and K08. She has also received foundational support from the ACS and B*CURED. While training in the UK, she received funding from the Wellcome Trust and Medical Research Council.

Selected research Articles
 
 
 
 Mechanisms and clinical impact of antifungal drug resistance.

References 

1974 births
Living people
Fellows of the Royal College of Physicians
Alumni of the University of Cambridge
University of Cincinnati faculty
Yale University faculty
Johns Hopkins University people
American neurologists
Cancer researchers
American people of British descent